Randolph William Thrower (September 5, 1913 – March 8, 2014) was an American attorney. He served as Commissioner of Internal Revenue under President Richard Nixon from 1969 to 1971.

Early life and education

Thrower was born in Tampa, Florida. He graduated from Georgia Military Academy in 1930.  He received an undergraduate degree from Emory University in 1934 and received his law degree from the Emory University School of Law in 1936.

Career

Following graduation from law school he joined the firm of Sutherland Asbill & Brennan LLP, a law firm with principal offices in Atlanta and Washington, D.C. He became a partner and remained one until his death.  Many of his early cases involved handling appeals for death row inmates in Georgia prisons. According to the New York Times, Thrower was haunted for the rest of his life by the case of his client Will Coxson, a black teenager who had been convicted for rape. Thrower was convinced he was innocent. Thrower had just joined the United States Marines, so he let another lawyer take over the appeal, believing that Coxson would surely be acquitted by the Supreme Court of Georgia. However, Coxson was put to death while Thrower was serving in World War II.

In 1942 he joined the FBI, then became a captain in the U.S. Marine Corps, being deployed to the Philippines and Okinawa during World War II.

Thrower, running as a Republican, unsuccessfully challenged incumbent segregationist James C. Davis for a seat in Congress in 1956.

He served as Commissioner of Internal Revenue under President Richard Nixon from 1969 to 1971. During his tenure he revoked the tax-exempt status of private schools that excluded blacks. He also helped to draft the Tax Reform Act of 1969. However, he was alarmed by requests from the White House for the IRS to perform tax audits on Nixon's enemies. In 1971 he requested a meeting with Nixon, believing that the president would be horrified to learn that some of his aides were attempting to use the IRS for political purposes. Instead of a meeting with Nixon, he got a phone call from John D. Ehrlichman telling him that he was fired. He accepted the White House announcement that he had "resigned for personal reasons" and quietly returned to the Atlanta law firm. A few years later he visited the IRS headquarters on business, where he was spontaneously greeted by employees as a hero.

From 1980 to 1992 he was chairman of the City of Atlanta's Board of Ethics.

Recognition

In 1993, Thrower received the American Bar Association Medal, the ABA's highest honor, for his public, professional, and government service. He was the recipient in 1995 of the Court of Federal Claims Special Service Award and received the Tax Section's Distinguished Service Award for 1996. In 1992 he received the Leadership Award of the Atlanta Bar Association and more recently the Segal-Tweed Founders Award of the Lawyers' Committee for Civil Rights Under Law. Thrower was presented with the "American Inns of Court Professionalism Award for the Eleventh Circuit" in May 2003.

Personal life

He was married for 70 years to Margaret Logan Munroe, whom he met at Emory. They lived in Atlanta and had five children. He turned 100 in September 2013 and died in March 2014 at his home in Atlanta.

See also
 List of centenarians (jurists and practitioners of law)

References

External links
Martindale-Hubbell Law Directory
"New Faces of 1956," Time, October 29, 1956.
American Inns of Court, Professionalism Award Biography
https://web.archive.org/web/20110716171324/http://www.sutherland.com/newsevents/results.aspx?Keyword=thrower&NewsType=&EventType=&Practice=&Industry=&Year=&FromSearchPage=newsevents
http://www.whitehousetapes.net/transcript/nixon/let-democrats-squeal
Time (magazine)
Stuart A. Rose Manuscript, Archives, and Rare Book Library, Emory University: Randolph W. Thrower papers, 1930-2014

1913 births
2014 deaths
People from Tampa, Florida
People from Atlanta
Military personnel from Florida
Federal Bureau of Investigation agents
Emory University alumni
Georgia (U.S. state) lawyers
Georgia (U.S. state) Republicans
Commissioners of Internal Revenue
Emory University School of Law alumni
American centenarians
Men centenarians
Woodward Academy alumni
20th-century American lawyers